British Airways Maintenance Cardiff (BAMC), also known as British Airways Maintenance is a major aircraft maintenance facility located near Cardiff Airport and a wholly-owned subsidiary of British Airways and part of British Airways Engineering. It carries out heavy maintenance on all of British Airways Boeing long haul aircraft.

History
In June 1990, a proposal was made to build a £70m hangar for maintenance of the BA 747 fleet at Cardiff Airport to employ 1,200 people. It was formally opened in June 1993. From February 2008, BAMC also maintained Boeing 767-300 series aircraft for BA whilst a further advance in capability has seen the introduction of Boeing 777-200ER/LR and Boeing 777-300ER aircraft from July 2010. The hangar also has the capability to handle a Boeing 787.

Structure
It has a three-bay hangar with two additional 'Nose In' facilities for interior modifications. It is based at Tredogan near Rhoose in the Vale of Glamorgan. BAMC employs in excess of 650 people, in three main departments:

 Production
 Planning & Materials 
 Compliance

Other BA operations in the area include British Airways Avionic Engineering at Pontyclun, Rhondda Cynon Taff, and British Airways Interiors Engineering in Blackwood, Caerphilly.In 2022 All the three subsidiaries were bought under one roof at BAMC facilities at Cardiff airport

External links
 Interserve
 Maintenance building
 History of British Airways
 British Airways Boeing 747-400 in D-Check (YouTube)

Aerospace companies of the United Kingdom
Companies based in Cardiff
Organisations based in the Vale of Glamorgan
British Airways
Companies established in 1993
1993 establishments in Wales
Aircraft maintenance companies